The McLaren Technology Centre is the headquarters of the McLaren Group and its subsidiaries, located on a 500,000 m2 (50-hectare) site in Woking, Surrey, England. The complex consists of two buildings: the original McLaren Technology Centre, which acts as the main headquarters for the group, and the newer McLaren Production Centre, primarily used for manufacturing McLaren Automotive cars.

The main building is a large, roughly semi-circular, glass-walled building, designed by architect Norman Foster and his company, Foster + Partners. The building was short-listed for the 2005 Stirling Prize, which was won by the Scottish Parliament building. Approximately 1,000 people work at the Technology Centre. It is home to the McLaren Formula One constructor and McLaren Automotive, the manufacturer of the McLaren F1 and McLaren Senna, as well as other companies of the McLaren Group. It was also the main setting of McLaren's cartoon, Tooned.

In 2011, the size of the centre was doubled after a second building, the McLaren Production Centre, was built. McLaren is also planning an extension to this building to be used as an applied technology centre, as well as to house a new wind tunnel and driver simulator for McLaren Racing.

Features
The building is accompanied by a series of artificial lakes: one formal lake directly opposite that completes the circle of the building, and a further four 'ecology' lakes. Together they contain about 50,000 m³ of water. This water is pumped through a series of heat exchangers to cool the building and to dissipate the heat produced by the wind tunnels. The main working space of the building is split into 18 metre wide sections known as 'fingers' that are separated by  corridors known as 'streets'. Facilities for  employees include a 700-seat restaurant, a juice and coffee bar, a swimming pool and a fitness centre. An underground Visitor and Learning Centre is connected to the main building by a walkway.

A , rectangular-circuit shaped wind tunnel is located at one end of the building. Team McLaren uses it for testing and development of aerodynamic parts, as well as testing aerodynamic set-ups. The tunnel contains 400 tonnes of steel and the air is propelled by a  fan that rotates at up to 600 rpm.

The Technology Centre consolidated all aspects of the McLaren Group at one site, instead of the 18 separate sites previously occupied.

History
McLaren's original application to build a new headquarters was made in 1995 and was unopposed by Woking Borough Council, however the development of such a large industrial site in green belt land led the Department of the Environment to order a public inquiry. The Environment Secretary, John Gummer, gave the development his approval in March 1997 under rules which allow development in the green belt "in very special circumstances"; Gummer said the McLaren application was such a case due to the economic and business arguments of the proposals and that he took the view that "[McLaren] is exceptional, both in the quality of its products and its achievements."

Work on the project, originally known as the Paragon Technology Centre, started in 1998 and about 4,000 construction workers were involved in what the Financial Times said "[was] claimed to be the biggest privately funded construction project in Europe." In February 2000, DaimlerChrysler purchased 40 percent of the McLaren Group and McLaren subsequently announced it would build the Mercedes-Benz SLR McLaren at the new facility.

Ron Dennis explained one of his rationales for the project in 2000: "Put a man in a dark room, he's hot, it smells bad, versus a guy in a cool room, well-lit, smells nice... When you throw a decision at those two individuals, who's going to be better equipped to effect good judgment and make a good decision?"

McLaren employees started using the facility in May 2003. McLaren has not disclosed the project's cost, but BBC News suggested a figure of £300m.

McLaren Production Centre
A second facility, the McLaren Production Centre, was built beside the McLaren Technology Centre in 2011 and serves as the production site of McLaren Automotive's road cars, including the McLaren 720S and McLaren Senna.

Extension
Planning permission for an extension to the McLaren Production Centre was granted in 2016. This "applied technology centre" will include "an aerodynamic research facility, workshops, research and development space, offices, meeting rooms, teaching and training space, vehicle preparation and assembly spaces, together with terraced car parking and two car park decks, cycle parking, a replacement helipad, and service areas."

Sale

On April 20, 2021, New York Stock Exchange listed REIT, Global Net Lease (NYSE: GNL), announced that they had agreed to acquire the McLaren Group Headquarters in a sale-leaseback transaction for £170 million. The transaction is expected to close in the second quarter of 2021 and will include a 20-year, NNN lease with no landlord obligations. The McLaren Group is said to have pursued the sale-and-leaseback deal to help deliver a financial boost, as it allows it to capitalize the expansive facility in Woking and then reinvest that money into the core operations of the company.

References 

Cropley, S (14. December, 2004). DreamWorks. Autocar (pp. 56–59).

External links

 McLaren Technology Centre official website
 Video tour of the building

2004 establishments in England
Buildings and structures in Surrey
Science and technology in the United Kingdom
Motor vehicle assembly plants in the United Kingdom
Foster and Partners buildings
Formula One
McLaren Group
Woking
Lakes of Surrey